FCRA may refer to:

 Fair Credit Reporting Act, United States
 Foreign Contribution (Regulation) Act, 2010, India